Jandaha ( in Hindi : जंदाहा ) is a block in Vaishali district, Bihar state, According to the census website, all blocks in  Bihar state  nomenclature as C.D. Block (community development blocks).

Jandaha Jandaha (Vidhan Sabha constituency) was an assembly constituency in Vaishali district in the Indian state of Bihar.

Overview
As a consequence of the orders of the Delimitation Commission of India, Jandaha (Vidhan Sabha constituency) emerged in 1962 and ceased to exist in 2010.

It was part of Hajipur (Lok Sabha constituency).

Election results 1962 -2010

1977–2010
List of MLAs of Jandaha Vidhan Sabha Constituency is as follows:

major roads

NH-233

villages
Number of Panchayat : 23*
Now 2 Panchayats became part of Newly constituted Jandaha Nagar Panchayat with 14 wards, Total Population 19488, SC-2683, ST-2, Others-16803.
Number  of Villages : 124

This is a list of villages in Jandaha block, Vaishali district, Bihar state, India.

Population and communities
Male Population : 106575  (2009 ist.)
female Population : 101262  
Total Population : 207837
SC Total Population : 44768  
ST Total Population : 50
Minority Total Population : 13585  
Population Density : 1382  
Sex Ratio : 950

public distribution system
Nos of HHs : 31808  
BPL Card Holders : 29131
Antodaya Card Holders : 5622
Annapurna Card Holders : 218
APL : 29351 
No of Fair Price Shops: 101

Education
literacy rate : 70% (2001 ist.)
male literacy rate : 80.2%
Female literacy rate : 67.7%

School
Primary School : 135 (2009 ist.)
Upper Primary School : 103

Banking
number of bank : 50+

References 

Community development blocks in Vaishali district